Superman Returns is the novelization of the 2006 film Superman Returns, written by Marv Wolfman.

Story
  The book is a movie tie-in and is, therefore, basically the same as the movie with minor changes that come with artistic license.  However, two major changes significantly deviate from the movie: Superman not having a shard of kryptonite inside him as he throws the kryptonite island into space and Jason’s non-linkage to Superman.
  Superman retaining his powers even with a piece of kryptonite inside him is a hot topic that puts consistency into question, as evidenced by the talk pages.
  Jason’s real identity is a fertile ground for a sequel.

Minor Details
  Superman’s trip to Krypton is detailed in the book (ch. 5, pp. 37–48). This is most probably the segment in the movie that did not make the final cut.
  Jor-El and Lara's courtship is presented (ch. 1, pp. 12–17).
  Clark remembers the first time he used his heat vision, triggered by hormonal spurts, just like in the TV series Smallville (p. 64).
  Ma Kent is dating Ben Hubbard, selling the Kent farm and moving to Montana (p. 76).
  In the movie, it is implied that Jason recognizes Clark as Superman when the child sees the reporter beside the image of Superman on TV, in the Daily Planet.  In the book, Jason recognizes Superman as Clark and has nearly finished articulating his observation when Superman cuts him off, in the seaplane after Superman saved the trio – Lois, Richard and Jason – from the sinking ship (p. 285).
  The bank robber shot Superman’s head, not specifically stated as the left eye as shown in the movie (p. 183).
  The Fins played against the Ravens in the Boeing 777 rescue scene (p. 136).
  Clark has taken in eight bottles of beer (p. 112) at the Ace o' Clubs with a ninth in front of him that he pushed away (p. 117) before saving the space shuttle and the airplane.
  In the movie, it appears that Lois fell for Richard White because Richard is the human version of Superman: good-looking, confident and can fly (a plane).  In the book, Clark thinks that Richard looks very much like him, i.e., Superman (p. 153).
  It is implied in the book that Superman created the crystal ship, that he used to visit the remains of Krypton, in the Fortress of Solitude (p. 89).
  It was Lex Luthor with the help of Stanford who released the photos of the remains of Krypton, leading to Superman leaving Earth (p. 297).

Major Details
  Superman lifts the kryptonite island without a shard of kryptonite imbedded in his body.  Only a stab wound with no bleeding is noted by hospital personnel (p. 316).
  Jason is not linked to Superman.  Brutus is killed by Lois by pulling a bookcase down his head, snapping his neck (p. 256).  However, just like in the movie, it is Jason who finds Superman near-drowning (p. 303).  There is no scene in the book where Superman recites Jor-El’s words to Jason.

Media Translations
  Films and books are different media.  Framing a story from film to book and vice versa is not always flawless.
  Marv Wolfman dated his Acknowledgments 12/15/05.  The screenwriters may have made changes after said date (assuming Marv Wolfman finished the novelization on said date).  Since the book is published 27 days earlier than the movie opening, it is possible that the “major details” are deliberately changed to keep the surprises intact.

References
  Superman Returns.  Film.  Directed by Bryan Singer.  Led by Brandon Routh.  Warner Bros., 2006.
 Wolfman, Marv.  Superman Returns.  New York: Warner Books, 2006.  

2006 American novels

Superman novels
Novels based on films
Superman (1978 film series)